Shadowverse is an anime television series adaptation of its namesake video game. The series is animated by Zexcs and directed by Keiichiro Kawaguchi, with Rintaro Isaki and Deko Akao handling series composition, Hiroki Harada designing the characters, and Yoshihiro Ike composing the series' music. The series aired from April 7, 2020, to March 23, 2021, on TV Tokyo and has been simulcast internationally on Crunchyroll. The band Penguin Research performed the first opening theme, "Kirifuda" (lit. Trump Card), while Yui Ogura performed the first ending theme, "Happiness Sensation". The second opening theme, "Shinsekai" (New World), was performed by FLOW, while the second ending theme, "Kokoro Darenimo" (Heart to Everyone), was performed by the Game Jikkyōsha Wakuwaku Band.

A second anime series, titled Shadowverse Flame, has been announced.  The main staff members are returning to reprise their roles.  The series premiered on April 2, 2022. The opening theme is "Shingan" (The Mind's Eye) by Lanndo featuring Keina Suda, while the ending theme is "My Turn" by Yui Ogura.

Plot

Season 1
Hiro Ryūgasaki is an ordinary middle school student at Tensei Academy. Through a strange occurrence, Hiiro obtains a mysterious smartphone with the popular digital card game Shadowverse app installed. Through the game, Hiro meets rivals, meets new friends, participates in tournaments, and forms bonds with others. Later, Hiro and his friends discover that the true purpose of Shadowverse is to save the world from an impending doomsday event.

Season 2: Shadowverse Flame
Set three years after the events of the first season. Light Tenryu enrolls at Shadowverse College after receiving an invite and pre-loaded deck from the school's founder, Wolfram Zerga. Light has no idea how to even play Shadowverse at first but is told the college is the key to his destiny. He soon joins a soon to be disbanded club called "Seventh Flame." Meanwhile, the newly reformed Genesis Corp has started research into a new artifact called the Arc that has been mysteriously stolen.

Characters

Season 1
 	
 
 Hiro is a 2nd-year middle school student at Tensei Academy. He is extremely perseverant and has a strong genuine love for the game. He lives with his grandfather and had long believed that his parents died during an accident while he was young, however it was later revealed his parents are trapped inside the Tree of Woe, an invention developed by his father's company that backfired and was destined to destroy the world. He plays the Dragoncraft class. He returns in the second season as a member of the Seven Shadows, the top Shadowverse players in the world who hold a secret behind Light's Digifriend Draconir.
 	
 
 Luca is a middle school student at a different school than Hiro's. At a young age, a truck killed his parents and badly injured his sister, Shiori, who lives in a rehabilitation hospital. Luca plays Shadowverse with the goal to raise enough money for Shiori to recover. He is rarely happy due to Shiori's condition, much to Shiori's chagrin who just wants to see her older brother smile. He plays the Bloodcraft class. He returns in the second season as a member of the Seven Shadows, the top Shadowverse players in the world who hold a secret behind Light's Digifriend Draconir.
 	
 
 Mimori is Hiro's classmate and one of his best friends. She worries a lot about being too ordinary.  She also is not a fan of ghosts and other scary things. She plays the Forestcraft class. She returns in the second season having continued her education and became a high schooler.
 	
 
 Kazuki is Hiro's classmate and one of his best friends. He is great at sports, but still has room for improvement when it comes to Shadowverse.  Due to having to take care of his six younger brothers and sisters, he is surprisingly responsible. He plays the Swordcraft class.
 	
 
 Kai is a 1st-year middle school student at Tensei Academy. He became part of Hiro's group of friends after hearing about him beating the school bully Takuma and challenging him to a Shadowverse duel. He is extremely analytical and proclaims himself as a "genius among geniuses". He plays the Runecraft class. 
 	
 
 Alice is a child idol with millions of fans. She enjoys Shadowverse but it gives her mixed feelings as her managers force her to play "cute" cards which prevent her from playing and enjoying Shadowverse to her full potential. She became part of Hiro's group of friends when bumping into Mimori at a mall and challenging her to a game of Shadowverse. She plays the Shadowcraft class. She returns in the second season showing she has continued her idol career and gives advice to Light.
 	
 
 Mauro is a teenager whom Hiro first met at the semi-finals of the National Shadowverse Tournament, but appeared to mysteriously already know Hiro and his father. He takes great thrill in slowly chasing his opponents and backing them into a corner. Later it's revealed he was alone and homeless as a child, so Leon adopted him, with the sole purpose of developing Mauro's Shadowverse skills so he can eventually sacrifice his life to save the world from the Tree of Woe. He plays the Havencraft class.
 	
 
 Leon is the CEO of Genesis Corp, the creator of Shadowverse. Originally his company was inventing the Tree of Blessings which was designed to bring good fortune to the world, only for it to backfire and become the Tree of Woe which will eventually destroy the world. Leon then invented the Shadowverse game with the purpose of shutting down the Tree of Woe and saving the world. Formerly plays the Havencraft class, he currently plays the Portalcraft class.
 	
 
 Marguerite is Leon's secretary who sometimes accuses Leon of being impulsive. She has become the new CEO of Genesis Corp in the second season after the events of the first season.

Season 2
Light Tenryu
 A brand new student at Shadowverse College. He has never played Shadowverse before the start of the season. He's bad with machines and bad at lying. He's very good though at keeping his promises. His Digifriend is the mysterious Draconir. He plays using the Dragoncraft class.

Subaru Makabe
Light's first friend at Shadowverse College. He prefers to be laid back and not take things seriously. He actually resents Shadowverse because of the pressure from his family to become a pro at it but becomes more serious and confident after joining Seventh Flame. His Digifriend is Baccherus. He plays using the Shadowcraft class.

Itsuki Mitsutagawa
President of the Seventh Flame club. He prefers cute and flowery things which alienated him from other kids growing up. His Digifriend is Slade. He plays using the Forestcraft class.

Shion Otosaka
A solitary and reclusive person. She's incredibly smart but has a hard time connecting with others. This leads to her only interacting with others via her digital avatar, Lady & Gentleman. Originally the secret president of the Sixth Magic club, she joined Seventh Flame after losing to Light. Her Digifriend is Milady and she plays using the Runecraft class.

Ren Kazamatsuri
She's a very athletic and ditzy person with a love of heroes. This alienates her from others around her due to her not being girly enough. She was originally from the Fifth Sword club but joined Seventh Flame in hopes of getting to be who she truly is. Her Digifriend is Amyroth and she plays using the Swordcraft class.

Tsubasa Takanashi
Former president of the Third Feather club. She initially lost interest in Shadowverse after her best friend quit the game after repeated harassment from Haruma Hazeura. She has since become more confident and assertive after joining Seventh Flame. Her Digifriend is Wingy and she plays using the Havencraft class.

Ryoga Jasei
Former student & president of Shadoba Collage's Second Blood. His Digifriend is Demonium and he plays using the Bloodcraft class, but rejects him. This led to a confrontation with Itsuki.

Haruma Hazeura
Director of the First Reaper club. An enemy of Light, who intends to destroy Seventh Flame.

Mikado Shirogane
Board chairman of Shadowverse Battle College. His Digifriend is Garuel.

References

External links
 Anime official website
 TV Tokyo official website
 

2020 anime television series debuts
Anime television series based on video games
Crunchyroll anime
TV Tokyo original programming
Zexcs